is a Japanese publishing company. It was established on June 14, 1961. In April 2009, the US publisher Digital Manga Publishing announced a co-branding operation with Shinshokan, to license  and  manga from Shinshokan's Wings, Dear, and Dear+ anthologies under the DokiDoki imprint (the name being Japanese onomatopoeia for a heartbeat).

Manga magazines
Cheri+
Dear+
Huckleberry

Wings

References

External links
 

 
Book publishing companies in Tokyo
Magazine publishing companies in Tokyo
Comic book publishing companies in Tokyo
Manga distributors
Publishing companies established in 1961
1961 establishments in Japan